The 2022 Women's Six Nations Championship was the 22nd Women's Six Nations Championship, an annual rugby union competition contested by the national teams of England, France, Ireland, Italy, Scotland and Wales. England were the defending champions, having won a COVID shortened version of the tournament in 2021. There was no limit on the number of players each team may call up to play in the competition.

Note: Number of caps are indicated as of the first match of the tournament (26 March 2022).

England 
Head coach:  Simon Middleton

On 7 March Simon Middleton announced England's 40 player squad for the tournament

France 
Head coach:  Annick Hayraud

On 14 March 2022 Annick Hayraud announced their 35 player squad for the tournament.

On 29 March Céline Ferer, Maïlys Traoré and Safi N'Diaye were all added to the squad to face Ireland

Caroline Boujard was added to the squad prior to the fourth round match against Wales.

Ireland 
Head coach:  Greg McWilliams

On 3 March 2022 Greg McWilliams announced his 38 player squad for the tournament.

On 21 March Nichola Fryday was named captain for the tournament.

On 19 April 2022 Laura Feely, Laura Sheehan, Mary Healy, Shannon Touhey, Sene Naoupu, Niamh Byrne and Alice O'Dowd were all called up to the squad.

Italy 
Head coach:  Andrea Di Giandomenico

On 14 March 2022 Andrea Di Giandomenico announced his squad for the championship.

Due to a COVID-19 outbreak in the Italy squad Federica Cipolla was added to the squad for the Round 3 game against Ireland.

Scotland 
Head coach:   Bryan Easson

On 15 March 2022 Scotland head coach Bryan Easson announced his team for the 2022 championship.

Panashe Muzambe was added to the squad prior to Scotland's second-round game against Wales.

Wales 

Head coach:  Ioan Cunningham

On 17 March 2022 Cunningham named their 37 player squad for the championship.

References 

squads
2022 Squads